Tovar, usually preceded by the particle de (meaning from), is a surname that was adopted in the Middle-Ages by a Castilian noble house that received the lordship of the village of Tovar from Fernando III. It has since spread to several Spanish and a few Portuguese branches.

The Tovar surname in the Americas appears mainly as a toponymic derived from the many settlements of this name founded there by the Spanish, and therefore does not share the same genealogical origin.

People
 Alonso Miguel de Tovar, a Spanish baroque painter
 César Tovar, a Venezuelan Major League Baseball player
 Ezequiel Tovar, Venezuelan baseball player
 Fernando Sánchez de Tovar, a medieval Spanish nobleman and admiral
 Francisco de Paula Vieira da Silva de Tovar, 1st Viscount of Molelos, a Portuguese nobleman and general
 Jorge Tovar, a Mexican sculptor
  José de Guevara y Tovar, Spanish viceroy of Navarre
 Gustavo Tovar Arroyo, a Venezuelan poet
 Juan Sancho de Tovar, 1st Marquis of Berlanga
 Juan de Tovar y Toledo, a Spanish nobleman and military of the Reconquista
 Luis Felipe Tovar, a Mexican actor
 Lupita Tovar, Mexican-American actress
 Manuel Felipe Tovar, President of Venezuela from 1859 to 1861
 Martín Tovar Ponte, a Venezuelan politician
 Martín Tovar y Tovar, a Venezuelan painter
Miguel Ángel Tovar, a Venezuelan actor and fashion model
 Rigo Tovar, a Mexican singer
 Rodrigo Tovar Pupo, a Colombian paramilitar
 Vicente López Tovar, a Republican soldier in the Spanish Civil War
 Virginia Tovar Martín, Spanish art historian, author, and professor; foremost scholar in the study of architecture and urban planning of Madrid during the Baroque period.
 Sancho de Tovar, a Castillian-born, Portuguese navigator and explorer
 Sancho de Tovar e Silva, grandson of the former, a Portuguese nobleman and military

See also

Tova
Tovar (disambiguation)